William Bradshaw (born 1882) was an English professional footballer who played as an outside right for various clubs in the 1900s.

Football career
Bradshaw was born in Burnley and after playing for Burnley Belvedere, he joined  Woolwich Arsenalof the Football League Second Division in 1900. He remained with the "Gunners" for four years, scoring two goals in four appearances. He then spent a season in the Southern League with Fulham before returning to the Second Division  of the Football League with Burton United in 1905. In his two years at Burton, he made 64 league appearances, scoring 14 goals. The club finished in the penultimate place in the league table in 1906, and the following season in 1907 finished bottom. The club was then voted out of the Football League.

Bradshaw then joined his home-town club, Burnley for another season in the Second Division, before dropping out of league football, with spells at Burnell's Ironworks, Chester and Ton Pentre.

Family
His father Harry and brother Joe were involved with Arsenal at some point in their careers, as manager and player respectively.

References

1882 births
English footballers
Association football forwards
Arsenal F.C. players
Fulham F.C. players
Burton United F.C. players
Burnley F.C. players
Chester City F.C. players
Ton Pentre F.C. players
English Football League players
Southern Football League players
Year of death missing